Korshikoviella is a genus of green algae in the family Characiaceae.

The genus name of Korshikoviella is in honour of Aleksandr Arkadievich Korshikov 1889–1942), who was a Ukrainian botanist from the National University of Kharkiv.

The genus was circumscribed by Paul Claude Silva in Taxon vol.8 on page 63 in 1959.

References

External links

Sphaeropleales genera
Sphaeropleales